The 1954 Denver Pioneers football team was an American football team that represented the University of Denver as a member of the Skyline Conference during the 1954 college football season.  In their second and final season under head coach Bob Blackman, the Pioneers compiled a 9–1 record (6–1 against conference opponents), won the Skyline championship, were ranked No. 18 in the final Coaches Poll, and outscored opponents by a total of 298 to 96.

The 1954 team was inducted as a group into the University of Denver Athletic Hall of Fame in 2007. At the time, the group was "widely considered the greatest in DU history".

Schedule

References

Denver
Denver Pioneers football seasons
Mountain States Conference football champion seasons
Denver Pioneers football